Deborah Leila Martin (born 23 February 1955) is a former women's cricketer for the Australia women's cricket team whose played three Test matches against New Zealand in 1979. A right-handed batsman and right-arm medium-pace bowler, she scored 73 runs at an average of 18.25.

References

1955 births
Australia women Test cricketers
Sportswomen from New South Wales
Living people
Cricketers from Sydney